Repose (French: Le Repos, 'Rest') is a c.1871 oil on canvas painting by Édouard Manet, now in the Rhode Island School of Design Museum.

The painting is a portrait of the artist Berthe Morisot, who was married to Manet's brother Eugène, resting on a sofa beneath a then fashionable Japanese print (in this case by Utagawa Kuniyoshi). There is a striking contrast between the light tone of her dress and dark tones of the furniture and the serenity of the subject with the violent activity on the print above her head.

Manet himself described the work as a study in physical and psychological repose — “not at all in the character of a portrait.”

References

1871 paintings
Paintings by Édouard Manet
Collection of the Rhode Island School of Design Museum